David Leroy Reeves (May 27, 1872 – August 12, 1949) was an American football player and coach.  He served as the first head football coach at Drexel Institute, where he accomplished an undefeated season in which the team did not allow any points to opponents.

Career
After graduating from Lafayette College in 1896, Reeves became the first head football coach at Drexel Institute.  In his first season in 1898, the team went undefeated, finishing with a 7–0–0 record and did not allow any points against the entire season.

After serving as Drexel's football coach, Reeves worked for The Times.

In 1904, Reeves was elected secretary and treasurer of the Philadelphia Phillies, and remained in the position until January 25, 1909.  From 1913 through 1916, Reeves served as the National League secretary under John K. Tener.  Following his MLB career, Reeves returned to the Philadelphia Public Ledger as the sports editor.

In 1921, Reeves resigned from his position at the Ledger to return to Lafayette as the graduate manager of athletics.  Reeves was inducted into the Lafayette Maroon Club Hall of Fame in 1978 for his service as an Athletic Administrator from 1921 through 1946.

Head coaching record

Football

References

1872 births
1949 deaths
American football quarterbacks
Drexel Dragons football coaches
Lafayette Leopards football players
Lafayette Leopards baseball players
People from Cape May, New Jersey
Players of American football from New Jersey
Sportspeople from Cape May County, New Jersey